Destination dispatch is an optimization technique used for multi-elevator installations, in which groups of passengers heading to the same destinations use the same elevators, thereby reducing waiting and travel times. Comparatively, the traditional approach is where all passengers wishing to ascend or descend enter any available lift and then request their destination.

Using destination dispatch, passengers request travel to a particular floor using a keypad, touch screen, or proximity card room-key prior in the lobby and are immediately directed to an appropriate elevator car.

Algorithms

Based on information about the trips that passengers wish to make, the controller will dynamically allocate individuals to elevators to avoid excessive intermediate stops. Overall trip-times can be reduced by 25% with capacity up by 30%.

Controllers can also offer different levels of service to passengers based on information contained in key-cards. A high-privilege user may be allocated the nearest available elevator and always be guaranteed a direct service to their floor, and may be allocated an elevator with exclusive use; other users, such as handicapped people, may be provided with accessibility features such as extended door-opening times.

Limitations
The smooth operation of a destination dispatch system depends upon each passenger indicating their destination intention separately. In most cases, the elevator system has no way of differentiating a group of passengers from a single passenger if the group's destination is only keyed in a single time. This could potentially lead to an elevator stopping to pick up more passengers than the elevator actually has capacity for, creating delays for other users. This situation is handled by two solutions, a load vane sensor on the elevator, or a group function button on the keypad. The load vane will tell the elevator controller that there is a high load in the elevator car, this makes it so the elevator doesn't stop at other floors until the load is low enough to pick up more passengers. The group function button asks for how many passengers are going to a floor, and then the system sends the correct number of elevators to that floor if available.

References

External links

Understanding the Benefits and Limitations of Destination Dispatch

Elevators
Optimization algorithms and methods